Andrei Valeryevich Glukhov (born 1 June 1972) is a former Olympic rower who competed for Russia in the two Olympic Games. He won bronze medal in the coxed eight competition 1996 Summer Olympics.

References 
 
 

1972 births
Living people
Russian male rowers
Rowers at the 1996 Summer Olympics
Rowers at the 2000 Summer Olympics
Olympic rowers of Russia
Olympic bronze medalists for Russia
Olympic medalists in rowing
World Rowing Championships medalists for Russia
Medalists at the 1996 Summer Olympics